Trichaeta is a genus of moths in the subfamily Arctiinae. It was described by Charles Swinhoe in 1892.

Species
Trichaeta aurantiobasis (Rothschild, 1910)
Trichaeta bivittata (Walker, [1865])
Trichaeta orientalis Szent-Ivány, 1942
Trichaeta parva Aurivillius, 1910
Trichaeta pterophorina (Mabille, 1892)
Trichaeta quadriplagata (Snellen, 1895)
Trichaeta schultzei Aurivillius, 1905
Trichaeta teneiformis (Walker, 1856)
Trichaeta tigrina (Walker, [1865])
Trichaeta vigorsi (Moore, 1859)

Former species
Trichaeta fulvescens (Walker, 1854)

References

Arctiinae